The General Certificate of Secondary Education (GCSE) is an academic qualification in a particular subject, taken in England, Wales, and Northern Ireland. State schools in Scotland use the Scottish Qualifications Certificate instead. Private schools in Scotland may choose to use GCSEs from England.

Each GCSE qualification is offered in a specific school subject (English literature, English language, mathematics, science, history, geography, art and design, design and technology, business studies, classical civilisation, drama, music, foreign languages, etc).

The Department for Education has drawn up a list of preferred subjects known as the English Baccalaureate for England on the results in eight GCSEs including English, mathematics, the sciences (physics, chemistry, biology, computer science), history, geography, and an ancient or modern foreign language.

Studies for GCSE examinations take place over a period of two or three academic years (depending upon the subject, school, and exam board), starting in Year 9 or Year 10 for the majority of students, with examinations being sat at the end of Year 11 in England and Wales.

History

Previous qualifications
Before the introduction of GCSEs, students took CSE (Certificate of Secondary Education) or the more academically challenging O-Level (General Certificate of Education (GCE) Ordinary Level) exams, or a combination of the two, in various subjects.  The CSE broadly covered GCSE grades C-G or 4–1, and the O-Level covered grades A*-C or 9–4, but the two were independent qualifications, with different grading systems. The separate qualifications were criticised for disadvantaging the bottom 42% of O-Level entrants who failed to receive a qualification, and the highest-achieving CSE entrants who had no opportunity to demonstrate higher ability.

In its later years, O-Levels were graded on a scale from A to E, with a U (ungraded) grade below that. Before 1975, the grading scheme varied between examination boards, but typically there were "pass" grades of 1 to 6 and "fail" grades of 7 to 9. However the grades were not displayed on certificates.

The CSE was graded on a numerical scale from 1 to 5, with 1 being the highest, and 5 being the lowest passing grade. Below 5 there was a U (ungraded) grade. The highest grade, 1, was considered equivalent to an O-Level C grade or above, and achievement of this grade often indicated that the student could have taken an O-Level course in the subject to achieve a higher qualification. As the two were independent qualifications with separate syllabi, a separate course of study would have to be taken to "convert" a CSE to an O-Level in order to progress to A-Level.

There was a previous attempt to unite these two disparate qualifications in the 1980s, with a trial "16+" examination in some subjects, awarding both a CSE and an O-Level certificate, before the GCSE was introduced. The final O-level/CSE examinations were sat in 1987.

Introduction of the GCSE
GCSEs were introduced in September 1986 to establish a national qualification for those who decided to leave school at 16, without pursuing further academic study towards qualifications such as A-Levels or university degrees. They replaced the former CSE and O-Level qualifications, uniting the two qualifications to allow access to the full range of grades for more students. However, the exam papers of the GCSE sometimes had a choice of questions, designed for the more able and the less able candidates.

Upon introduction, the GCSEs were graded on a letter scale, from A to G, with a C being set as roughly equivalent to an O-Level Grade C, or a CSE Grade 1, and thus achievable by roughly the top 25% of each cohort.

Changes since initial introduction

Over time, the range of subjects offered, the format of the examinations, the regulations, the content, and the grading of GCSE examinations has altered considerably. Numerous subjects have been added and changed, and various new subjects are offered in the modern languages, ancient languages, vocational fields, and expressive arts, as well as citizenship courses.

Introduction of the A* grade
In 1994, the A* grade was added above the grade A, to further differentiate attainment at the very highest end of the qualification. This remained the highest grade available until 2017. The youngest pupil to gain an A* grade was Thomas Barnes, who earned an A* in GCSE Mathematics at the age of 7.

Mathematics tiers
Initially, the mathematics papers were set in three tiers: Higher; Intermediate; and Foundation, to cover different mathematical abilities. The Higher level corresponded to grades A-C; the Intermediate level corresponded to grades C-E; and the Foundation level corresponded to grades E-G. However, it was later realised that nobody who sat the Foundation level had any chance of passing the subject at grade C, so this arrangement was replaced by a two-tier arrangement where the Intermediate and Foundation levels were merged. This brought the subject into line with other subjects that typically had foundation and higher level papers. This meant that somebody who sat the new Foundation level could now achieve a grade C, which was considered the formal pass level.

With the introduction of numbered grades, the Higher tier provides grades 9-4 and the Foundation tier provides grades 5-1.

2000s reforms
Between 2005 and 2010, a variety of reforms were made to GCSE qualifications, including increasing modularity and a change to the administration of non-examination assessment.

From the first assessment series in 2010, controlled assessment replaced coursework in various subjects, requiring more rigorous exam-like conditions for much of the non-examination assessed work, and reducing the opportunity for outside help in coursework.

2010s reforms

Under the Conservative government of David Cameron, and Education Secretary Michael Gove, various changes were made to GCSE qualifications taken in England. Before a wide range of reforms, interim changes were made to existing qualifications, removing the January series of examinations as an option in most subjects, and requiring that 100% of the assessment in subjects from the 2014 examination series is taken at the end of the course. These were a precursor to the later reforms.

From 2015, a large-scale programme of reform began in England, changing the marking criteria and syllabi for most subjects, as well as the format of qualifications, and the grading system.

Under the new scheme, all GCSE subjects were revised between 2015 and 2018, and all new awards will be on the new scheme by summer 2020. The new qualifications are designed such that most exams will be taken at the end of a full 2-year course, with no interim modular assessment, coursework, or controlled assessment, except where necessary (such as in the arts). Some subjects will retain coursework on a non-assessed basis, with the completion of certain experiments in science subjects being assumed in examinations, and teacher reporting of spoken language participation for English GCSEs as a separate report.

Other changes include the move to a numerical grading system, to differentiate the new qualifications from the old-style letter-graded GCSEs, publication of core content requirements for all subjects, and an increase in longer, essay-style questions to challenge students more. Alongside this, a variety of low-uptake qualifications and qualifications with significant overlap will cease, with their content being removed from the GCSE options, or incorporated into similar qualifications. A range of new GCSE subjects were also introduced for students to study from 2017, 2018. 2019, and 2020.

GCSE examinations in English and mathematics were reformed with the 2015 syllabus publications, with these first examinations taking places in 2017. The remainder were reformed with the 2016 and 2017 syllabus publications, leading to first awards in 2018 and 2019, respectively.

For GCSE Science, the old single-award "science" and "additional science" options are no longer available, being replaced with a double award "combined science" option (graded on the scale 9–9 to 1–1 and equivalent to 2 GCSEs). Alternatively, students can take separate qualifications in chemistry, biology, and physics. Other removed qualifications include a variety of design technology subjects, which are reformed into a single "design and technology" subject with multiple options, and various catering and nutrition qualifications, which are folded into "food technology". Finally, several "umbrella" GCSEs such as "humanities", "performing arts", and "expressive arts" are dissolved, with those wishing to study those subjects needing to take separate qualifications in the incorporated subjects.

Implications for Wales and Northern Ireland
These reforms do not directly apply in Wales and Northern Ireland, where GCSEs will continue to be available on the A*-G grading system. However, due to legislative requirements for comparability between GCSEs in the three countries, and allowances for certain subjects and qualifications to be available in Wales and Northern Ireland, some 9–1 qualifications will be available, and the other changes are mostly adopted in these countries as well.

In Northern Ireland, a decision was taken by Minister of Education, Peter Wier (DUP), in 2016 to align the A* Grade to the 9 Grade of the English reformed qualifications. The first award of the new A* grade being in 2019. A C* grade was also introduced in Northern Ireland to align to the 5 Grade in England, again with first awarding in 2019. GCSEs in Northern Ireland remain modular and science practicals can count towards the overall grade outcome. Speaking and listening also remains a component of the GCSE English Language specification.

Examination boards
Historically, there were a variety of regional examination boards, or awarding organisations (AOs), who set examinations in their area. The 5 examination boards include:

 Assessment and Qualifications Alliance (AQA), which absorbed the following boards: AEB, JMB, NEAB, and SEG.
 Oxford, Cambridge and RSA Examinations (OCR), which absorbed the Oxford Delegacy of Local Examinations, Cambridge Local Examinations, Oxford & Cambridge Examinations Board, MEG, and RSA exam boards.
 Pearson Edexcel, which absorbed the LREB, BTEC, and ULEAC boards.
 Welsh Joint Education Committee (WJEC or CBAC), the main examining board in Wales.
 Council for the Curriculum, Examinations & Assessment (CCEA), the examining board and regulator in Northern Ireland.

The examination boards operate under the supervision of Ofqual (The Office of Qualifications and Examinations Regulation) in England, Qualifications Wales in Wales, and the CCEA in Northern Ireland.

In England, AQA, OCR, and Pearson operate under their respective brands. Additionally, WJEC operate the brand Eduqas, which develops qualifications in England. CCEA qualifications are not available in England.

In Wales, WJEC is the only accredited awarding body for GCSEs in the public sector, and thus no other board formally operates in Wales. However, some qualifications from the English boards are available as designated qualifications in some circumstances, due to not being available from WJEC.

In Northern Ireland, CCEA operates as both a board and a regulator. Most qualifications from the English boards are also available, with the exception of English language and the sciences, due to requirements for speaking and practical assessment, respectively.

Structure and format
Students usually take at least 5 GCSEs in Key Stage 4, in order to satisfy the long-standing headline measure of achieving 5 A*-C grades, including English, Mathematics, and Science. The exact qualifications taken by students vary from school to school and student to student, but schools are encouraged to offer at least one pathway that leads to qualification for the English Baccalaureate, requiring GCSEs in English language, English literature, mathematics, science (including computer science), a modern or ancient language, and history or geography.

Subjects
The list of currently available GCSE subjects is much shorter than before the reforms, as the new qualifications in England all have core requirements set by the regulator, Ofqual, for each subject. In addition, there are several subjects where only one board offers qualifications, including some that are only available in one country of the UK for that reason. The following lists are sourced from the exam board websites.

Core subjects
These are the requirements for achieving the English Baccalaureate headline measure in league tables, from 2017 onwards. Other subjects, especially religious studies, citizenship studies, computer science, or physical education are compulsory in majority of secondary schools as these subjects form part of the National Curriculum at Key Stage 4.

 English
 English Language and English Literature
 Mathematics
 Science
 any three of Biology, Chemistry, Physics, and Computer Science; or Combined Science.
 Languages: one GCSE in a modern or ancient language
Modern languages: Arabic, Bengali, Chinese (Cantonese), Chinese (Mandarin), French, German, Modern Greek, Gujarati, Modern Hebrew, Irish (only in Northern Ireland), Italian, Japanese, Punjabi, Persian, Polish, Portuguese, Russian, Spanish, Turkish, Urdu, Welsh (only in Wales)
 Ancient languages: Classical Greek, Biblical Hebrew, Latin
 Humanities: 
 History or Geography (or both)

Other subjects
 Sciences and Mathematics
 Astronomy
 Geology
 Psychology
 Statistics
 Sociology
 Humanities and Social Sciences:
 Ancient History
 Citizenship Studies
 Classical Civilisation
 Religious Studies
 Business and Enterprise:
 Business Studies
 Economics
 Design and Technology:
 Design and Technology
 Electronics
 Engineering
 Food Preparation and Nutrition
 Arts:
 Art and Design
 Dance
 Drama
 Film Studies
 Media Studies
 Music
 Photography
 Graphics
 Other:
 Physical Education

Northern Ireland (CCEA) 
 Agriculture and Land Use
 Business and Communication Systems
 Child Development
 Construction and the Built Environment
 Contemporary Crafts
 Digital Technology
 Further Mathematics
 Government and Politics
 Health and Social Care
 Home Economics
 Hospitality
 Irish
 Irish
 Gaeilge
 Journalism in the Media and Communications Industry
 Learning for Life and Work
 Leisure, Travel and Tourism
 Motor Vehicle and Road User Studies
 Moving Image Arts
Short Course Religious Studies
 Wales (WJEC/CBAC) only:
 Information and Communication Technology
 Welsh (compulsory in Welsh schools):
 Welsh Language (first language)
 Welsh Literature (first language)
 Welsh Second Language

Grades and tiering

GCSEs are awarded on a graded scale, and cross two levels of the Regulated Qualifications Framework (RQF): Level 1 and Level 2. These two levels roughly correspond, respectively, to foundation and higher tier in tiered GCSE qualifications. Level 1 qualifications constitute GCSEs at grades G, F, E, and D or 1, 2, and 3. Level 2 qualifications are those at grades C, B, A, and A* or 4, 5, 6, 7, 8, and 9.

The tiering of qualifications allows a subset of grades to be reached in a specific tier's paper. Formerly, many subjects were tiered, but with the mid-2010s reform, the number of tiered subjects reduced dramatically, including the removal of tiering from the GCSE English specifications. Untiered papers allow any grade to be achieved. Coursework and controlled assessment tasks are always untiered.

In the past, mathematics qualifications offered a different set of tiers, with three. These were foundation tier at grades G, F, E, and D; intermediate tier at grades E, D, C, and B; and higher tier at grades C, B, A, and A*. This eventually changed to match the tiers in all other GCSE qualifications.

The evolution of grades, and a rough comparison between them is as follows:

Letter grades
When GCSEs were first introduced in 1988, they were graded on a letter scale in each subject: A, B, C, D, E, F, and G being pass grades, with a U (unclassified) grade below that which did not qualify the student for a certificate.

These grades were initially set such that a GCSE grade C was equivalent to an O-Level grade C or a CSE grade 1, though changes in marking criteria and boundaries over the years mean that this comparison is only approximate.

Infrequently, X and Q grades are awarded. X indicates that a course was not completed in full, and therefore an appropriate grade cannot be calculated. The Q (query) grade is a temporary grade that requires the school to contact the examining body. These latter two grades are both usually provisional, and are replaced with a regular grade once any issues have been resolved. X grades are also sometimes used for other purposes, on rare occasions, such as to indicate that an examiner found offensive material or hate speech within a student's responses. In some cases, this may lead to the student losing all marks for that paper or course. These grades are most common in subjects which discuss ethical issues, such as Biology, Religious Studies, and Citizenship.

In 1994, an A* grade was added above the initial A grade to indicate exceptional achievement, above the level required for the A grade.

Under the letter grade scheme, foundation tier papers assess content at grades C to G, while higher tier papers assess content at grades A* to C. In foundation tier papers, the student can obtain a maximum grade of a C, while in a higher tier paper, they can achieve a minimum grade of a D. If a higher tier candidate misses the D grade by a small margin, they are awarded an E. Otherwise, the grade below E in these papers is U. In untiered papers, students can achieve any grade in the scheme. This scheme has been phased out in England, but remains in Wales and Northern Ireland. In Northern Ireland, the A* grade has been adjusted upwards with the introduction of the numerical scheme in England, such that an A* is equivalent to a new English grade 9. Northern Ireland also added a C* grade to line up with the grade 5 in the English grading.

Numerical grades (2017 onwards)
From 2017 in England (and in Wales and Northern Ireland on qualifications from the English-based awarding bodies), most GCSEs are now assessed on a 9-point scale, using numbers from 9 to 1, and, like before, a U (unclassified) grade for achievement below the minimum pass mark. Under this system, 9 is the highest grade, and is set above the former A* classification, equivalent to the new Northern Irish A* grade. The former C grade is set at the new grade 4, now known as a "standard pass", and grade 5 being considered a "strong pass" under the new scheme.

Although fewer qualifications have tiered examinations than before, the tiering system still exists. At foundation tier, the grades 1, 2, 3, 4, and 5 are available, while at higher tier, the grades 4, 5, 6, 7, 8, and 9 are targeted. Once again, if a higher-tier student misses the grade 4 mark by a small margin, they are awarded a grade 3. Controlled assessment and coursework tasks are untiered.The youngest person known to have achieved a grade 9 is Ellie Barnes who achieved the grade in Mathematics aged 8 years old.

Results

GCSE results are published by the examination board in August, for the previous exam series in April to June of the same year. They are usually released one week after the A-Level results, on the Thursday which falls between 20 August and 26 August. The examination results are released to centres (schools) prior to the release to candidates and the public. Examination results are released by the Joint Council for Qualifications (JCQ), which represents the main GCSE awarding organisations. Some boards and schools release results online, although many still require students to attend in person to collect their results from the centre they sat exams at.

In England, these results then go on to inform league tables published in the following academic year, with headline performance metrics for each school.

Due to COVID-19, students who where supposed to sit their GCSE's in the years 2020 and 2021 obtained qualifications based off predicted grades from their teachers. Traditional exams however were sat by students in the summer of 2022.

1988–2018 (England, Wales and Northern Ireland)

Source: Joint Council for General Qualifications via Brian Stubbs.

Note: In the final year DES statistics for O-Levels are available, and across all subjects, 6.8% of candidates obtained a grade A, and 39.8% achieved grades A to C.

2018–present

England

Assessment types

Modular and linear GCSEs
In the past, many GCSE qualifications used a modular system, where some assessment (up to 60% under the 'terminal rule') could be submitted prior to the final examination series. This allowed for students to take some units of a GCSE before the final examination series, and thus gave indication of progress and ability at various stages, as well as allowing for students to resit exams in which they did not score as highly, in order to boost their grade, before receiving the qualification.

Various qualifications were available as both modular and linear schemes, and schools could choose whichever fit best for them.

Under the Conservative government of David Cameron, and Education Secretary Michael Gove, reforms were initiated which converted all GCSEs from 2012 (for assessment from 2014) to de facto linear schemes, in advance of the introduction of new specifications between 2015 and 2018 (for first assessment from 2017 to 2020). These new rules required that 100% of the assessment in a GCSE be submitted in the final examination series, at the same time as applying for certification of the full qualification. The examination boards complied by modifying the syllabi of the remaining GCSE qualifications to remove modular components.

Both modular and linear assessment have been politically contentious, and the opposition Labour Party UK, and particularly the former MP Tristram Hunt stated that it was their policy that such reforms be halted and reversed, maintaining modular assessment in both GCSEs and A-Levels. The modular scheme is supported by the University of Oxford and the University of Cambridge.

Coursework and controlled assessment
In some subjects, one or more controlled assessment or coursework assignments may also be completed. These may contribute either a small or large proportion of the final grade. In practical and performance subjects, they generally have a heavier weighting to reflect the difficulty and potential unfairness of conducting examinations in these areas.

In the past, these were available in a variety of subjects, including extended writing in English, the sciences, business, and foreign languages; practical assessment in the sciences and technology subjects; and speaking assessments in languages. Since the 2010s reform, the availability has been cut back, with mostly only design and technology subjects and performing arts retaining their controlled assessment contributions. In English language, the spoken language assessment has been downgraded to an endorsement which is reported separately on the English certificate, not contributing to the grade. The English spoken language assessments are set throughout the course and assessed by teachers. Students can be awarded a Pass, Merit, Distinction or Not Classified. In the sciences, practical exercises are a required part of the qualification, but are not directly assessed; they are only endorsed by a teacher's statement.

The balance between controlled assessment and examinations is contentious, with the time needing to be set aside for coursework sessions being seen as a burden on the school timetable. However, the use of controlled assessment allows for the marking of some work outside of examination season, and can ease the burden on students to perform well on the day of the examination.

Exceptional and mitigating circumstances
For pupils with learning difficulties, an injury/repetitive strain injury (RSI) or a disability, help is offered in these forms:

Extra time (the amount depends on the severity of the learning difficulty, such as dyslexia, disability, injury or learning in English as a second language provided that the pupil has been studying in the UK for no more than 2 years)
Amanuensis (somebody types or handwrites as the pupil dictates; this is normally used when the pupil cannot write due to an injury or disability)
A word processor (without any spell-checking tools) can be used by pupils who have trouble writing legibly or who are unable to write quickly enough to complete the exam
A different format exam paper (large print, Braille, printed on coloured paper, etc.)
A 'reader' (a teacher or exam invigilator can read out the words in the exam paper, but they cannot explain their meaning)
A different room (sometimes due to a disability a pupil can be placed in a room by themselves or with selected others; this also happens when an amanuensis is used, so as not to disturb the other candidates and to not give other candidates a potential answer to a question. All exam rooms are covered by separate dedicated invigilators.)

Any of the above must be approved by the examination board. Other forms of help are available with the agreement of the examination board, but the above are the most common.

If a student is ill or an unforeseen circumstance occurs that may affect their performance in an examination, they can apply for special consideration from the examination board. The procedures vary depending on how much the student has completed, but in the case of sitting an examination, they may receive a percentage increase on their grade to reflect this, or a consideration of their coursework and other assessment alongside their predicted grades, to calculate a fair grade based on their other attainment.

Progression
GCSEs, BTECs or other Level 2 qualifications are generally required in order to pursue Level 3 qualifications such as A-Levels or BTEC (Business and Technology Education Council) beyond the age of 16. The requirement of 5 or more A*–C or 9–4 grades, including English and mathematics, is often a requirement for post-16 qualifications in sixth form colleges, further education colleges and institutes of technology after leaving secondary school. Where the subject taken post-16 has also been taken at GCSE, it is often required that the student achieved a grade C, 4, or 5 as a minimum at GCSE.

Most universities, in addition to their post-16 requirements, seek that their candidates have grades of C or 4 or higher in GCSE English and mathematics. Many of those who achieve below this standard will later retake GCSE English and mathematics to improve their grade. The November examination series exists for this purpose, to allow a faster path to gain these grades than waiting until the following summer's main series. Leading universities often take into account performance at GCSE level, sometimes expecting applicants to have a high proportion of A and A* grades.

Comparison with other qualifications

Within the UK
England, Wales & Northern Ireland

GCSEs in England, Wales, and Northern Ireland are part of the Regulated Qualifications Framework. A GCSE at grades G, F, E, D, 1, 2, or 3 is a Level 1 qualification. A GCSE at C, B, A, A*, 4, 5, 6, 7, 8, or 9 is a Level 2 qualification. Qualifications are not awarded to grades U, X or Q. Level 2 qualifications are much more sought-after, and generally form minimum requirements for jobs and further study expectations.

The BTEC is another Level 1/2 qualification available in the same territories as the GCSE, and is graded at 5 levels. At Level 2, comparable to A*, A, B, and C respectively are the Distinction*, Distinction, Merit, and Pass. A BTEC at Level 1 is simply marked as "Level 1", with no subdivision. Below that level, a U is awarded, as in GCSEs.  Other qualifications at this level include Cambridge Nationals, Key Skills, and Functional Skills.

Some schools in the UK choose to enter their students for IGCSE examinations.

Scotland

The comparable qualifications in Scotland are the National 4 and National 5 awards (formerly Standard Grades and/or Intermediates).

Outside the UK
The international version of the GCSE is the IGCSE, which can be taken anywhere in the world and includes additional options relating to coursework and the language the qualification is pursued in. All subjects completed in the fifth of the European Baccalaureate are generally equivalent to the GCSE subjects.

Current and Former British territories

The education systems of current and former British territories, such as Gibraltar, and Nigeria, also offer the qualification, as supplied by the same examination boards. Other former British colonies, such as Singapore and Zimbabwe, continue to use the O-Level qualification.

Ireland

In the Republic of Ireland, the Junior Certificate is a comparable qualification.

United States

In the United States, a high school diploma is required for entry into college or university. In the UK, this is considered to be at the level of the GCSE, awarded at Year 11. For college and university admissions in the UK, a high school diploma may be accepted in lieu of the GCSE if an average grade better than D+ is obtained in subjects with a GCSE counterpart.

As A-Levels are generally expected for UK university admission, a high school diploma is not considered enough for direct university entry in the UK. Advanced Placement programmes or International Baccalaureate are considered equal to the A-Level and earn points on the UCAS tariff. They may therefore be accepted in lieu of A-Levels for university entry in the UK by US students. However, entry requirements differ at each university and may take subsequent work history after high school in place of A-Levels/AP for future study applications.

The SAT Reasoning Test and SAT Subject Tests, or the ACT may also be considered in an offer for direct university entry.

US students who have studied at a university, a senior college, a community college; or graduated with a Certificate, Diploma or associate degree may have their credits and award transferred into a UK university, subject to entry requirements.

France

The Diplôme National du Brevet  (previously Brevet des Collèges) is generally considered to be comparable to four GCSEs. The Brevet is usually sat in troisième (or year 10 in England and Wales).

Criticism and controversy

Grade disparity
Statistics released by London's Poverty Profile found overall GCSE attainment in London to be greater than the rest of England. 39% of pupils in Inner London and 37% in Outer London did not get five GCSEs at A* to C, compared with 42% in the rest of England. Also, according to an ITV News report, UK students tend to outperform Jersey students on GCSE examinations.

Gender bias is another area of concern. Department of Education data shows that the relative performance gap between girls and boys widened significantly under GCSEs, compared with O-Levels.

Subject decline
The declining number of pupils studying foreign languages in the UK has been a major concern of educational experts for many years. In 2015, Paul Steer, the Exam Board Chief of the British exam board OCR, expressed that "unless we act soon, even GCSE French and German could face the chop".

Grade inflation
When the GCSE system was introduced, there were comments that it was a dumbing down from the previous GCE O-Level system (as it took the focus away from the theoretical side of many subjects, and taught pupils about real-world implications and issues relating to ICT and citizenship).

In addition, the proportions of candidates awarded high grades at GCSE have been rising for many years, which critics attribute to grade inflation. By comparing pupils' scores in the YELLIS ability test with their GCSE results over a period of about 20 years, Robert Coe found a general improvement in grades awarded which ranges from 0.2 (science) to 0.8 (maths) of a GCSE grade. Only slightly more than half of pupils sitting GCSE exams achieve the 5 A* to C grades required for most forms of academic further education.

One of the important differences between previous educational qualifications (and the earlier grading of A-Levels) and the later GCSE qualifications was supposed to be a move from norm-referenced marking to criterion-referenced marking. In a norm-referenced grading system, fixed percentages of candidates achieve each grade. With criterion-referenced grades, in theory, all candidates who achieve the criteria can achieve the grade. A comparison of a clearly norm-referenced assessment, such as the NFER Cognitive Ability Test or CAT, with GCSE grading seems to show an unexpected correlation, which challenges the idea that the GCSE is a properly criterion-based assessment.

Mental health
Senior school leaders, the NSPCC, and Childline have expressed concern that GCSEs in their current exam-only format are too stressful and will lead to mental health crises. Students in 2019 were subjected to more exams and spent longer in the exam hall than their 2016 counterparts. While a GCSE student in 2016 had an average of 18 exams to prepare for, totalling 24 hours and 30 minutes, the average examinee in 2019 sat 22 exams, totalling 33 hours.

The Association of School and College Leaders (ASCL) surveyed 606 headteachers from schools that had entered pupils for exam-only GCSEs. They found reports of panic attacks, sleepless nights, depression, extreme fatigue, self-harming, and suicidal thoughts.

Even before all GCSE qualifications adopted the exam-only format, students complained about the memorization load, the need to write continuously for long hours, how their social lives have been affected and the need for sleeping pills and painkillers. They have observed younger siblings starting to panic about the exams at the beginning of the course- not just in the final year or the final few months.

Widening the social divide
The incorporation of GCSE awards into school league tables, and the setting of targets at school level at above national average levels of attainment, has been criticised. At the time of introduction, the E grade was intended to be equivalent to the CSE grade 4, and so obtainable by a candidate of average/median ability. Sir Keith Joseph set schools a target of 90% of their pupils obtaining at least a grade F (which was the "average" grade achieved in the past). This target was reached nationally about 20 years later. David Blunkett went further and set schools the goal of 50% of 16-year-olds gaining 5 GCSEs or equivalent at grade C and above, although these grades were previously only obtained by the top 30%. This was achieved with the help of equivalent and largely vocational qualifications. Labelling schools as failing if 40% of their pupils do not achieve at least 5 Cs, including English and Maths at GCSE, has also been criticised, as it essentially requires 40% of each intake to achieve the grades only obtained by the top 20% when GCSE was introduced.

In recent years, concerns about standards has led some public schools to complement GCSEs with IGCSEs within their curriculum, and to take their pupils straight to A-Level or the BTEC. Other schools, such as Manchester Grammar School, are replacing the GCSEs with IGCSEs in which there is an option to do no coursework. The new science syllabus has led to many public schools switching to the IGCSE Double Award syllabus.

The extent of the switching away from the terminal exam only GCSE to the IGCSEs in public and private schools was revealed in answers to a parliamentary question posed by Labour MP Lucy Powell in November 2018. The option to choose to do so is no longer open to state schools since the introduction of the new GCSEs graded 1–9.

The answers showed that in 2017–18, 91% of international GCSE entries in core (EBacc) subjects were in independent schools. A student in an independent school was 136 times more likely to follow an IGCSE than one in a state-funded school. Looking at entries in non-EBacc and EBacc subjects shows that three out of every four IGCSEs were sat in private schools.

The Labour Party has argued that it is grossly unfair that private school pupils get an easier path into universities as a consequence. The shadow education secretary, Angela Rayner MP, said: "We urgently need to get to the bottom of this situation. A full, root-and-branch review of Tory reforms to qualifications and their impact on pupils is needed."

Michael Gove, the architect of these reformed examinations, said in 2009: "Denying IGCSEs in core subjects to children in state schools will only serve to increase the level of inequality in education."

Errors and mistakes
Teachers and pupils have the option to question exam results and have the scripts marked again if they feel the grade awarded does not reflect the pupil's ability and expectations; or if they review a copy of the script and notice a marking error. In recent years, there have been complaints that GCSEs and GCE A-Levels were marked unfairly. (In 2012, for the first time in the history of the exams, the proportion of all GCSEs awarded an A*-C grade fell.)

This can be seen as, in general, more appeals being submitted each year, however the appeals rarely result in any grade changes as only 182 out of 6.2 million (0.003%) grades were changed in England in 2018, with most upheld appeals ending in no change of marks.

In one incident concerning the 2016 GCSE biology exam, there were complaints about the apparent lack of biology content in the exam. One of the questions in the biology exam asked students to define an "independent company", which some students perceived to be a business studies question.

The May 2017 English literature exam (under the regulation of OCR) wrongly implied that Tybalt, a character in Romeo and Juliet was not a Capulet. This serious flaw in the question confused many of the students. OCR accepted responsibility and claimed no pupil would be disadvantaged. The question was worth 40 marks.

In 2022, advance information was given by examination boards to students, providing them with information on what topics would/ wouldn't be on the exam. However, in the Physics paper 1 exam, a topic that was stated as "Not Assessed" came up, AQA accepted the mistake and awarded all students the full (9) marks to the question. Also, in 2022, a question on one of the higher Maths papers was leaked hours before students sat them. The exam board Edexcel has since apologised and conducted a full investigation.

Cancellations 

In 2020 as a result of the COVID-19 pandemic, GCSE examinations, along with all other May and June exams that year were cancelled. The government announced that GCSE and A-level grades would be awarded through teachers' assessments based on mock exams, coursework and other available evidence, moderated by a statistical standardisation model developed by Ofqual. This is the first cancellation of GCSEs since they were introduced.

An algorithm for deciding grades was originally introduced by Ofqual, which got used for A-Level grades. However, this caused backlash, causing the government to ultimately replace the algorithm with Center Assessed Grades for GCSEs on 17 August.

In 2021, GCSEs, along with A-level and AS exams, were cancelled again due to the pandemic and replaced with teacher assessed grades. The grades were decided based on previous mock exams, homework, classwork, and optional examinations set by Ofqual.

Calls for reform and abolition 
Support for scrapping GCSEs in England has increased because of the COVID-19 pandemic. Rethinking Assessment was established in September 2020 to call for assessment reform in secondary education, including scrapping GCSEs. Members include multi-academy trusts including the Academies Enterprise Trust and Bohunt Academy Trust, independents schools including Eton College, Bedales School and St Paul's Girls' School, and Lord Baker of Dorking, the Conservative who introduced GCSEs as education secretary in 1986.

In 2021, former Conservative prime minister John Major led calls by him and eight former education secretaries, both Conservative and Labour, for GCSEs to either be scrapped and replaced, reformed or reviewed. Former education secretaries who called for them to be scrapped included Lord Baker, Lord Blunkett and Alan Johnson, while those calling for changes, reforms or a review included Major and former education secretaries Baroness Morgan of Cotes, Justine Greening, Charles Clarke and Ruth Kelly. Former Labour schools minister David Miliband also called for them to be scrapped, as did Conservative MP Robert Halfon, who chairs the Education Select Committee in the House of Commons. Support for scrapping GCSEs also came from teaching unions, including the National Education Union which is the largest teaching union in the country, and a group of centrist one-nation Conservative MPs. Schools Minister Nick Gibb rejected the proposal, thinking that "it would be a huge mistake to abolish the tried and tested GCSEs".

In 2022, former Labour prime minister Tony Blair called for GCSEs and A-Levels to be scrapped and replaced by a new qualification and an examination based on the International Baccalaureate. Before the age of 16, pupils would be assessed through pupil assessment. From 16 to 18, they would be assessed continually on their subject knowledge and skills through multiple methods including examination, which would determine their final grade. Blair declined enacting a similar proposal when he was prime minister.

See also

 International General Certificate of Secondary Education (IGCSE), which is offered internationally as well as in some schools in the UK
 GCE Advanced Level; commonly referred to as "A-Levels", a set of exams that many pupils take after completing GCSEs that are more academically rigorous
 Business and Technology Education Council; referred to as "BTECs", another set of exams many pupils take after completing GCSEs, often in vocational subjects
 Predecessor qualifications to the GCSE:
 GCE Ordinary Level (O-Levels)
 Certificate of Secondary Education (CSE)
 School Certificate
 General Certificate of Education (GCE), which comprises O-Levels and A-Levels

Footnotes

Notes

References
 The Guardian, 25 August 2005, "It really is that bad" – GCSE standards
 The Guardian, 3 September 2005, "Top independent school to ditch GCSE science"

Educational qualifications in the Caribbean
Educational qualifications in England
School examinations
Secondary education in England
Secondary education in Northern Ireland
Secondary education in Wales
Secondary school qualifications
Standardised tests in the Caribbean
Standardised tests in England
Educational qualifications in Wales
Educational qualifications in Northern Ireland
Standardised tests in Wales
Standardised tests in Northern Ireland